Lhari County is a small county within the prefecture-level city of Nagqu in the Tibet Autonomous Region.

The 11th Dalai Lama was born in Lhari County, as were both of the rival candidates for the position of the current Panchen Lama.

Administrative divisions

The county contains the following township-level divisions and principal settlements:

Lhari Town
Arza Town	
Rongdoi Township	
Xarma Township	
Lingti Township		
Cora Township	()	
Codoi Township		
Zhongyu Township	
Zabbe Township	
Goqung Township

Villages
One of the villages in the county is Bagar.

Climate

References

 
Counties of Tibet
Nagqu